Central High School may refer to any of these institutions of secondary education:

In the United States

Alabama 
 Central High School (Phenix City, Alabama)
 Central High School (Tuscaloosa, Alabama) 
 Central High School (Hayneville, Alabama)

Arizona 
 Central High School (Phoenix, Arizona)

Arkansas 
 Buffalo Island Central High School, Monette
 Central High School (Helena–West Helena, Arkansas), West Helena
 Drew Central High School, Monticello
 Genoa Central High School, Texarkana
 Little Rock Central High School, Pulaski County
 White County Central High School, Judsonia

California 
 Central Union High School (El Centro, California)
 Central Valley High School (Bakersfield, California), a high school in California
 Central High School (Fresno, California)

Colorado 
 Aurora Central High School, Aurora
 Central High School (Grand Junction, Colorado)
 Greeley Central High School, Greeley
 Central High School (Pueblo, Colorado)

Connecticut 
 Central High School (Connecticut), Bridgeport
 Bristol Central High School, Bristol

Delaware 
 Sussex Central High School (Delaware), Georgetown

District of Columbia 
 Central High School (Washington, D.C.), Washington, D.C.

Florida 
 Central High School (Brooksville, Florida)
 Central High School (Milton, Florida), Milton, Florida
 Fort Pierce Central High School, Fort Pierce, Florida
 Miami Central High School, Miami, Florida
 Palm Beach Central High School, Wellington, Florida
 St. Petersburg High School, St. Petersburg, Florida, listed on the NRHP in Pinellas County, Florida

Georgia 
 Clarke Central High School, Athens
 Gordon Central High School, Calhoun
 Central High School (Carrollton, Georgia)
 Forsyth Central High School, Cumming
 Central Gwinnett High School, Lawrenceville
 Central High School (Macon, Georgia)

Illinois
Central High School (Burlington, Illinois)
Central High School (Camp Point, Illinois) 
Central High School (Clifton, Illinois)
Champaign Central High School, Champaign, Illinois
Crystal Lake Central High School, Crystal Lake, Illinois
Evansville Central High School, Evansville, Illinois
Hinsdale Central High School, Hinsdale, Illinois
Naperville Central High School, Naperville, Illinois
Peoria High School (Peoria, Illinois), locally known as "Central"
Plainfield Central High School, Plainfield, Illinois

Indiana 
 Brownstown Central High School
 Corydon Central High School
 Central High School (East Chicago, Indiana)
 Elkhart Central High School
 Evansville Central High School
 Floyd Central High School (Indiana), Floyds Knobs
 Muncie Central High School
 Central High School & Boys Vocational School, South Bend

Iowa 
 Central High School (De Witt, Iowa); see 2015–16 Northern Iowa Panthers women's basketball team
 Central Alternative High School, Dubuque Community School District
 Central Lee High School, Donnellson
 Central High School (Davenport, Iowa)
 Le Mars Central High School, listed on the NRHP in Plymouth County, Iowa
 Sioux City Central High School, Woodbury County

Kentucky 
 Central High School (Louisville, Kentucky)

Louisiana 
 Central High School (Catahoula Parish, Louisiana), Catahoula Parish
 Central High School (Central, Louisiana), Central
 Central High School (Shreveport, Louisiana), Caddo Parish

Maine 
 Central High School (Corinth, Maine), a high school in Maine

Maryland 
 Central High School (Maryland), Walker Mill

Massachusetts 
 Springfield Central High School

Michigan 
 Battle Creek Central High School
 Bay City Central High School
 Benzie Central High School, Benzonia
 Central High School (Detroit)
 Central High School (Grand Rapids, Michigan)
 Flint Central High School
 Forest Hills Central High School, Ada Township
 Kalamazoo Central High School
 Traverse City Central High School
 Walled Lake Central High School
 Portage Central High School

Minnesota 
 Central High School (Duluth, Minnesota), St. Louis County
 Central High School (Norwood Young America, Minnesota), a high school in Minnesota
 Central High School (Saint Paul, Minnesota)
 Central High School (South St. Paul, Minnesota), the former name of South St. Paul Secondary

Mississippi 
 Central High School (Jackson, Mississippi), a Mississippi Landmark

Missouri 
 Central High School (Cape Girardeau, Missouri)
 Central High School (Kansas City, Missouri)
 Francis Howell Central High School, Cottleville
 Central High School (St. Joseph, Missouri)
 Central High School (Springfield, Missouri)
 Central VPA High School, St. Louis
 Hazelwood Central High School
 New Madrid County Central, Howardville

Montana 
 Great Falls Central High School (disambiguation) (all in Montana)

Nebraska 
 Omaha Central High School, Douglas County

New Hampshire 
 Manchester Central High School

New Jersey 
 Central High School (Newark, New Jersey)
 Central Regional High School, Berkeley Township
 Hopewell Valley Central High School, Hopewell Township
 Hunterdon Central Regional High School, Flemington

New Mexico 
 Kirtland Central High School

New York 
 Valley Stream Central High School

North Carolina 
 Garinger High School (formerly Central High School), Charlotte 
 High Point Central High School
 Rutherfordton-Spindale Central High School, Rutherford County

North Dakota 
 Central High School (Devils Lake, North Dakota), Ramsey County
 Central High School (Fargo, North Dakota)
 Central High School (Grand Forks, North Dakota)

Ohio 
 Central High School, now the site of National Inventors Hall of Fame STEM High School, Akron
 Central High School (Cleveland, Ohio)
 Central High School (Columbus, Ohio) (closed 1982), Franklin County
 Central High School (Dayton, Ohio), a former high school; see Charlotte Reeve Conover
 Central High School (Mingo Junction, Ohio), listed on the NRHP in Jefferson County, Ohio
 Westerville Central High School

Oklahoma 
  Central High School (Central High, Oklahoma)
 Central High School (Oklahoma City, Oklahoma), listed on the NRHP in Oklahoma County, Oklahoma
 Central High School (Tulsa, Oklahoma)

Oregon 
 Central High School (Independence, Oregon)

Pennsylvania 
 Central Bucks High School (disambiguation), three high schools in Bucks County, PA
 Central Catholic High School (Pittsburgh)
 Central High School (Martinsburg, Pennsylvania)
 Central High School (Philadelphia), listed on the National Register of Historic Places in Philadelphia County, Pennsylvania, second oldest continually operated public high school in the United States
 Central Tech High School, Erie
 Columbia Central High School (Bloomsburg, Pennsylvania)
 Greensburg Central Catholic High School, in Greensburg, Pennsylvania

Rhode Island 
 Central High School (Providence, Rhode Island)

South Carolina 
 Central High School (Central, South Carolina), listed on the NRHP in Pickens County, South Carolina
 Central High School (Pageland, South Carolina)

South Dakota 
 Central High School (Aberdeen, South Dakota)
 Central High School (Rapid City, South Dakota)

Tennessee 
 Central High School (Bolivar, Tennessee), a high school in Tennessee
 Central High School (Camden, Tennessee), Camden, Tennessee
 McMinn Central High School, Englewood
 Central High School (Knoxville, Tennessee)
 Central High School (Memphis, Tennessee), listed on the NRHP in Shelby County
 Central High School (Nashville, Tennessee), now defunct, stood from 1921 to 1971
 Central High School (Wartburg, Tennessee), in Wartburg, Tennessee
 Chattanooga Central High School, Harrison
 Columbia Central High School (Columbia, Tennessee), listed on the NRHP in Maury County

Texas 
 Central High School (Beaumont, Texas), closed in 2018
 Central High School (Fort Worth, Texas)
 Central High School (Galveston, Texas), closed in 1968
 Central High School (Pollok, Texas)
 Central High School (San Angelo, Texas)

Virginia 
 Central High School (Painter, Virginia), Accomack County
 Central High School (Woodstock, Virginia)
 Central High School (King and Queen Court House, Virginia), King and Queen County, Virginia
 Central High School (Victoria, Virginia), Victoria, Lunenburg County, Virginia
 Central High School (Wise, Virginia)

Washington 
 Central Valley High School (Washington)

Wisconsin 
 Walter Reuther Central High School, Kenosha
 Westosha Central High School, Paddock Lake
 La Crosse Central High School
 West Allis Central High School
 Madison Central High School (Wisconsin), Madison

Wyoming 
 Cheyenne Central High School

Elsewhere
 Armenian Evangelical Central High School, East Beirut, Lebanon
 Central High School (San Juan, Puerto Rico), listed on the NRHP in San Juan, Puerto Rico
 St. Croix Central High School (Virgin Islands), St. Croix, U.S. Virgin Islands
 Central Etobicoke High School, Toronto, Ontario, Canada
 Ehime Prefectural Matsuyama Central Senior High School, Matsuyama, Ehime, Japan
 Yamagata Prefectural Yamagata Central High School, Yamagata, Yamagata, Japan; see 2014 Nippon Professional Baseball draft

See also
 Central Catholic High School (disambiguation)
 Central High, Oklahoma
 Center High School (disambiguation)
 Central School (disambiguation)